Desulfuromusa ferrireducens is a species of psychrophilic, Fe(III)-reducing bacteria. It is Gram-negative, rod-shaped and motile. Its type strain is 102T (=DSM 16956T =JCM 12926T).

References

Further reading
Vandieken, Verona, Niko Finke, and Bo Barker Jørgensen. "Pathways of carbon oxidation in an Arctic fjord sediment (Svalbard) and isolation of psychrophilic and psychrotolerant Fe (III)-reducing bacteria." Marine Ecology Progress Series 322 (2006): 29–41.
Margesin, Rosa, ed. Psychrophiles: from biodiversity to biotechnology. Springer, 2008.
Staley, James T., et al. "Bergey's manual of systematic bacteriology, vol. 3."Williams and Wilkins, Baltimore, MD (1989): 2250–2251.

External links
 LPSN
Type strain of Desulfuromusa ferrireducens at BacDive -  the Bacterial Diversity Metadatabase

Desulfuromonadales